The Galleriinae are a subfamily of snout moths (family Pyralidae) and occur essentially worldwide, in some cases aided by involuntary introduction by humans. This subfamily includes the wax moths, whose caterpillars (waxworms) are bred on a commercial scale as food for pets and as fishing bait; in the wild, these and other species of Galleriinae may also be harmful to humans as pests.

At the species level, they are the least diverse snout moth subfamily according to current knowledge, with 306 described species all together. However, as regards major lineages, the Galleriinae are quite diverse, with five tribes being recognized – more than in the Phycitinae, the most species-rich snout moth subfamily. One of these tribes, the Joelminetiini, has been described only in 2007, and presently contains a single and highly aberrant genus.

Description and ecology
 
The caterpillar larvae of Galleriinae usually have a sclerotised (hardened) ring around the base of seta SD1 on the first abdominal segment. Their pupae are comparatively easy to distinguish from other snout moths' by a readily apparent midline ridge running along the thorax and abdomen. In the imagines, the gnathos of the male genitalia is reduced to the point of disappearing altogether or (more rarely) with only the barest vestige remaining; this is quite characteristic except for a few Chrysauginae which have convergently lost the gnathos. Males produce very high chirping sounds with their tegulae, in some cases even regular "mating songs", though without specialized bioacoustics equipment this cannot be used for identification. Unusual for Pyralidae, adult Galleriinae may lack ocelli and even the proboscis (which is usually well developed in the family); as typical for the family, however, they usually have large labial palps which form a "snout".

Ecologically, the subfamily is noted for a number of species that coevolved with Hymenoptera, namely Apoidea (bees and relatives). The larvae may be parasites or symbionts, and the adults of such species at least to some degree are inquilines (though usually pursued by the nest inhabitants). Especially notable among these Galleriinae are the waxworms (Achroia and Galleria larvae) which are both significant as beekeeping pests and as commercial items, as well as Aphomia species. Others, especially the rice moth (Corcyra cephalonica) and Paralipsa, are noted pests of stored food products.

Systematics
The diversity of Galleriinae known in the mid-20th century was fully catalogued by P.E.S. Whalley of the UK Natural History Museum, but no dedicated phylogenetic analysis has been conducted. Notwithstanding, such studies exist for the Pyraloidea as a whole, and these indicate that the Galleriinae are a rather primitive lineage of Pyralidae, comparable to the Chrysauginae. The latter may be the closest living relatives of the Galleriinae, or an independent but equally ancient snout moth lineage that simply looks similar due to sharing many plesiomorphic traits.

The Galleriinae are currently divided into five tribes, though this may change eventually. For one thing, some genera are presently insufficiently studied or too aberrant to be firmly assignable to any one tribe; for another, in the absence of detailed phylogenetic studies the best systematic treatment for members of this subfamily remains a best guess. Furthermore, not all Galleriinae are known to science; new species and genera continue to be discovered. A supposed additional tribe ("Macrothecini") is based on a misidentified specimen of Cacotherapia interalbicalis; on the other hand the genus Joelminetia, of which the first specimens reached the hands of researchers only in the 1990s, turned out to be so distinct as to warrant establishment of its own monotypic tribe.

The tribes and genera – with some significant species also noted – in this subfamily are:

Cacotherapiini Munroe, 1995 (= Macrothecini)
 Alpheias Ragonot, 1891
 Alpheioides Barnes & McDunnough, 1912
 Cacotherapia Dyar, 1904
 Decaturia Barnes & McDunnough, 1912
 Genopaschia Dyar, 1914
Galleriini Zeller, 1848
 Achroia
 Cathayia Hampson in Ragonot, 1901
 Chevalierella Ghesquière, 1943
 Eloeidiphilos Praviel, 1938
 Galleria – greater wax moth, honeycomb moth
 Trachylepidia Ragonot, 1887
Joelminetiini Speidel & Witt, 2007
 Joelminetia Speidel & Witt, 2007
Megarthridiini Whalley, 1964
 Cataprosopus Butler, 1881
 Eulophopalpia Inoue, 1982
 Megarthridia Martin, 1956
 Omphalocera Lederer, 1863
 Omphalocera munroei – asimina webworm
 Perinetoides Marion, 1955
 Sphinctocera Warren, 1897
 Thyridopyralis Dyar, 1901

Tirathabini Whalley, 1964
 Acracona
 Acyperas
 Antiptilotis Meyrick, 1897
 Aphomia
 Bapara Walker, 1865
 Callionyma Meyrick, 1882
 Callionyma sarcodes
 Ceratothalama Meyrick, 1932
 Corcyra – rice moth
 Cristia Whalley, 1964
 Doloessa Zeller, 1848
 Eldana
 Epimorius Zeller, 1877
 Ertzica Walker, 1866
 Ethopia Walker, 1865
 Galleristhenia Hampson, 1917
 Heteromicta Meyrick, 1886
 Heteromicta pachytera
 Hypolophota Turner, 1904
 Lamoria
 Mampava Ragonot, 1888
 Mecistophylla Turner, 1937
 Metaraphia Hampson in Ragonot, 1901
 Meyriccia Hampson, 1917
 Microchlora Hampson in Ragonot, 1901
 Neoepimorius Whalley, 1964
 Neophrida Möschler, 1882
 Paralipsa Butler, 1879
 Paralipsa gularis – stored nut moth
 Paraphomia Hampson in Ragonot, 1901
 Parazanclodes Hampson in Ragonot, 1901
 Paroxyptera Ragonot, 1901
 Picrogama Meyrick, 1897
 Pocopaschia Dyar, 1914
 Pogrima Schaus, 1940
 Prasinoxena Meyrick, 1894
 Proropoca Hampson, 1916
 Prosthenia Hampson in Ragonot, 1901
 Schistotheca Ragonot, 1882
 Statia Ragonot, 1901
 Stenachroia Hampson, 1898
 Stenopaschia Hampson, 1906
 Thalamorrhyncha Meyrick, 1933
 Tirathaba Walker, 1864
 Xenophasma Dognin, 1905

incertae sedis
 Gallerites Kernbach, 1967
 Marisba Walker, 1863
 Rhectophlebia Ragonot, 1888 
 Yxygodes Viette, 1989

Footnotes

References

 Jia, Feng-You; Greenfield, Michael D. & Collins, Robert D. (2001): Ultrasonic Signal Competition Between Male Wax Moths. Journal of Insect Behavior 14(1): 19–33.  PDF fulltext
 Pitkin, Brian & Jenkins, Paul (2004): Butterflies and Moths of the World, Generic Names and their Type-species – Macrotheca. Version of November 5, 2004. Retrieved May 29, 2011.
 Savela, Markku (2011): Markku Savela's Lepidoptera and Some Other Life Forms: Galleriinae. Version of March 8, 2011. Retrieved May 29, 2011.
 Solis, M. Alma (2007): Phylogenetic studies and modern classification of the Pyraloidea (Lepidoptera). Revista Colombiana de Entomología 33(1): 1–8 [English with Spanish abstract]. HTML fulltext
 Zhou, Yihong; Kuster, Heidi K.; Pettis, Jeffrey S.; Danka, Robert G.; Gleason, Jennifer M. & Greenfield, Michael D. (2008): Reaction Norm Variants for Male Calling Song in Natural Populations of Achroia grisella (Lepidoptera: Pyralidae): towards a Resolution of the Lek Paradox. Evolution 62(6): 1317–1334.  PDF fulltext Supporting Information

External links
 Epimorius testaceellus, bromeliad pod borer

 
Moth subfamilies